is a Noh play based on the experiences of the 12th-century poet and travelling-monk Saigyō.

Original kernel
Saigyō was travelling to North Japan, when he sat in the shade of a willow-tree, later identified by Bashō as being close to the village of Ashino, and wrote a waka: 
" ‘Just a brief stop,’/ I said when stepping off the road/into a willow's shade/where a bubbling stream flows by,/as has time since my ‘brief stop’ began".

Main theme
A wandering priest, Yugyō Shonin, is given directions by an old man who recites Saigyō's poem before vanishing: the priest then realises it was the spirit of the willow tree.
By reciting a prayer to Amida Buddha, he enables the spirit to attain Buddhahood, for which the willow spirit thanks him in a dance sequence.

Later developments
Buson wrote a haiku on rocks and willows underneath the Pilgrim's Willow Tree, alluding to the Noh play.

See also

Eguchi (play)
Matsuyama tengu
Saigyōzakura
Sankashū

References

External links
 Saigyo in three Japanese No plays

Noh plays